Michael Pfaff  is an American musician, best known as one of the two current percussionists of heavy metal band Slipknot. He was also a member of the alternative rock band Dirty Little Rabbits as their keyboardist with fellow Slipknot band mate Shawn Crahan.

Career

Dirty Little Rabbits
Pfaff has been a lifelong friend of Slipknot bandmate Sid Wilson, who introduced him to Shawn Crahan in 2007. The two quickly hit it off where they formed a band together called Dirty Little Rabbits where he was the band's pianist. The band released two extended play's Breeding (2007) and Simon (2009) before releasing their debut and only eponymous album in 2010, before splitting up in 2012.

Slipknot
Following the dismissal of longtime Slipknot percussionist Chris Fehn in March 2019 due to him filing a lawsuit against the band, Pfaff was quickly contacted by Crahan while working on his day job about potentially replacing Fehn, which he accepted. He took over percussion duties, joining the band shortly before the filming of the music video for "Unsainted", the lead single off of their sixth studio album We Are Not Your Kind, released on 9 August 2019. Due to the appearance of his mask resembling a tortilla, Pfaff was quickly nicknamed "Tortilla Man" by fans and was known primarily by this title until the band finally revealed his identity in March 2022. Initially brought in as a touring member, Pfaff became an official full-time member of the band when they all went into the studio to record the seventh studio album The End, So Far. Pfaff sustained an ankle injury while performing on the band's 2022 European Tour.

Personal life
Pfaff attended New England Conservatory of Music in Boston, Massachusetts and received a masters degree in music. He attended Lawrence University, in Appleton, Wisconsin, for his undergraduate degree, also in music. He also has a wife and they have one child together.

Pfaff has accepted the nickname Tortilla Man as of 2022 via his personal Instagram account name “tortillapfaff”.

Discography

Slipknot

 The End, So Far (2022)

Dirty Little Rabbits

 Breeding (2007) 
 Simon (2009)
 Dirty Little Rabbits (2010)

References

American heavy metal drummers
American heavy metal singers
American male singers
Dirty Little Rabbits members
Living people
Nu metal drummers
Musicians from Des Moines, Iowa
Roadrunner Records artists
Slipknot (band) members
20th-century American drummers
American male drummers
Year of birth missing (living people)